Schöning or Schoening may refer to:

 Bill Schoening, American radio sportscaster
 Chevalier Schoening, a pseudonym of a European courtier
 Gerhard Schöning (1722–1780), Norwegian historian
 Hans Adam von Schöning (1641–1696), Prussian General Field Marshal
 Jacob Marius Schøning (1856–1934), Norwegian Minister of Trade
 Johann Schöning (1458–1502), Mayor of the Hanseatic city of Riga
 Kurd von Schöning (1789–1859), Prussian major general and military historian
  Louise Eleonore von Schöning  (1708–1784), Prussian noble woman
 Pete Schoening (1927–2004), American mountain climber
 Thomas Schöning (died 1539), Archbishop of Riga, 1528-1539
 Uwe Schöning (born 1955), Professor in the Department of Theoretical computer science at the University of Ulm
 Wilhelm Schöning (1908–1987), German commander during World War II